Axel en Helena van der Kraan were a sculptor-duo from the Netherlands, consisting of Axel van der Kraan (born 1949) and Helena van der Kraan-Maazel (1940–2020), active as sculptors and draftsman.

Live and work 
They lived and worked together in Rotterdam since 1987. In 1989, they were awarded the Hendrik Chabot Award. In 1990, at the Museum Boymans Van Beuningen, there was a retrospective of their work with sculptors, drawings, and photography.

Helena van der Kraan-Maazel died 14 June 2020 (her 80th birthday) in Rotterdam from cancer. She was described as an artist, who "observed with a concerned look, who recorded her surroundings in noiseless portraits."

According to Henny de Lange, Helena van der Kraan mainly sought with her photography "the beauty of the everyday."

Exhibitions, a selection 
 1978. Galerie Espace, Amsterdam.
 1989. Museum Boymans-Van Beuningen.

Works in public space 
 1989, Schillepaard van de Schilderswijk, The Hague
 1999, Keteltje, Wormerveer
 2006, De Smid, Barendrecht

References

External links 

 Axel van der Kraan at rotterdamsekunstenaars.nl.
 Helena van der Kraan at rotterdamsekunstenaars.nl.

Art duos
Dutch sculptors
Artists from Rotterdam